The Lincolnshire Women's cricket team is the women's representative cricket team for the English historic county of Lincolnshire. They play their home matches at various grounds across the county, and are captained by Rebecca Brooker. After joining the Women's County Championship in 2015, they competed in Division Three in the final season of the tournament in 2019. They have since competed in the Women's Twenty20 Cup. They are partnered with the East Midlands regional team, Lightning.

History
Lincolnshire Women's Cricket Association was formed in February 1947. Their representative team was due to play its first match against a Nottinghamshire XI at Belton Park on 14 June 1947 but the game was cancelled due to adverse weather. In 1948 Lincolnshire played two inter-county matches, beating Yorkshire Second XI at Kesteven and Grantham Girls' School on 3 July, and losing to Nottinghamshire Second XI at Belton Park on 17 July. 

Before joining the nationwide county structure in 2014, Lincolnshire Women had only competed in friendlies and regional competitions. In 2014, they competed in the Women's Twenty20 Cup, winning one of their four games in Division 4, against Northumberland Women. In 2015, they joined the Women's County Championship as well, finishing bottom of Division 4 North & East with one win. Since then, Lincolnshire remained in the bottom tier of both competitions, achieving their best season in 2018, finishing second in their division in both the County Championship and the T20 competition. In 2021, they competed in the East Midlands Group of the Twenty20 Cup, finishing 2nd with 3 wins. They also joined the East of England Championship in 2021, and finished 3rd out of 6 teams in their first season. They finished bottom of their group in the 2022 Women's Twenty20 Cup, and bottom of the group in the 2022 East of England Championship.

Players

Current squad
Based on appearances in the 2022 season.

Notable players
Players who have played for Lincolnshire and played internationally are listed below, in order of first international appearance (given in brackets):

 Kathryn Bryce (2018)

Seasons

Women's County Championship

Women's Twenty20 Cup

See also
 Lincolnshire County Cricket Club
 Lightning (women's cricket)

References

Cricket in Lincolnshire
Women's cricket teams in England